William Bayne may refer to:

William Bayne (naval officer) (died 1782)
William Bayne (1858–1922), Scottish writer and lecturer
William George Bayne (died 1910), chairman of the Shanghai Municipal Council
Bill Bayne (1899–1981), American baseball player

See also
William Bain (disambiguation)
Bayne (disambiguation)